Yousef al-Kalabi is an Iraqi politician, Leading member of Badr Organization and Security spokesman for Popular Mobilization Forces.

Bio
al-Kalabi, born in Baghdad 1978, is an Iraqi politician and former Assistant to the Deputy Chairman of the Popular Mobilization Forces for Combatant Affairs, Chairman of the Committee to Commemorate the Tikrit Massacre.He entered the Iraqi elections as a candidate for the Fatah Alliance. He is a Leading member of Badr Organization and Security spokesman for Popular Mobilization Forces.

Positions
 Member of Badr Organization
 Security spokesman for Popular Mobilization Forces

See also
 Hadi Al-Amiri
 Abu Mahdi al-Muhandis
 Mohanad Najim Aleqabi
 Ahmed Al Asadi

References

External links
 An Interview with Yousef al-Kalabi on Alhurra
 An Interview with Yousef al-Kalabi on Belady TV
 An Interview with Yousef al-Kalabi on Asia Network Television

Badr Brigade members
Iraqi politicians
Iraqi soldiers
Living people
1978 births
People from Baghdad
Iraqi Shia Muslims